This is a list of episodes of Yin Yang Yo!, an animated television series that aired on Jetix and Disney XD in the United States. The series aired 65 episodes.

Series overview

Episodes

Season 1 (2006–07)

Season 2 (2008–09)

External links

Lists of American children's animated television series episodes
Lists of Canadian children's animated television series episodes
Lists of Disney Channel television series episodes
E